Present Perfect is a 2017 LGBT-romantic Thai film directed by Anusorn Soisa-Ngim, starring 
Maroukasonti Kritsana and Tonawanik Adisorn. The film was produced by Nuttachai Jiraanont, Tanwarin Sukapisit and Chen Rong Hua. It was premiered in Thailand on March 9, 2017.

The film won the Best Film Award at the LGBTQ Amsterdam Film Festival in the Netherlands and screened at many film festivals worldwide, including the World Film Festival of Bangkok, Thailand, Serile Filmului Gay International Film Festival, Romania, Western Visayas Film Festival, Philippines, and Taiwan.

Synopsis
Following a painful breakup, Toey (Tonawanik Adisorn) decides to heal his broken heart in Higashikawa town where he meets Oat (Maroukasonti Kritsana), a man who travels to Japan to experience freedom for the last time in his life. From stranger to friends, romance sparks between the two. Before returning to the "real" world, the two men have to pick up the broken pieces and rebuild. It is a heartwarming journey as we follow the simple pursuit of love. This encounter forms a beautiful relationship between two men, because each has his own trauma.

Cast

Main
 Maroukasonti Kritsana as Oat
 Tonawanik Adisorn as Toey

Supporting
 Sittachai Priyada as Mhai
 Midori Tamate as Yumi

Sequel

Present Still Perfect 
Set to release March 12, 2020, Present Still Perfect is the sequel directed Anusorn Soisa-Ngim.

References

External links
 

2017 films
Thai LGBT-related films
Films shot in Japan
Thai-language films
2010s Japanese-language films
2017 LGBT-related films
2010s English-language films